Stanton B. Garner Jr. (born 1955) is an American scholar of drama, theater, and performance who specializes in modern and contemporary drama, theatre and performance theory, and medical humanities. A graduate of the Pennsylvania State University and Princeton University, he is currently James Douglas Bruce Professor of English and Theater at the University of Tennessee. With J. Ellen Gainor and Martin Puchner, he is co-editor of the Norton Anthology of Drama and The Shorter Norton Anthology of Drama (2009; 3rd ed. 2018) (W. W. Norton & Company). 

His late father, Stanton Garner (1925 - 2011), was a scholar of nineteenth-century American literature.

Publications

References

1955 births
Living people
University of Tennessee faculty
Pennsylvania State University alumni
Princeton University alumni